Castello Orsini (Italian for Orsini Castle)  is a  Middle Ages castle in Massa d'Albe, Province of L'Aquila (Abruzzo).

History

Architecture

References

External links

Orsini
Massa d'Albe